Annie McGuire is a Scottish reporter who presented BBC Scotland football phone-in show 'Your Call' and Sportsound. She also did guest links for Radio Scotland's New Music Zone and T in the Park coverage and stood in for presenter Vic Galloway. She also wrote occasionally for the Scottish edition of The Sunday Times. McGuire also stood in for Tam Cowan on Off The Ball during the summer of 2015.

Life and career 
Born in Elderslie, attended St. Cuthbert's High School, Johnstone, then studied Scottish Literature at the University of Glasgow, and Journalism Studies at University of Strathclyde. Her father was an English teacher. Her first experience of radio was Glasgow student station Subcity Radio.

She has also worked on the BBC sports programme Match of the Day and appeared on Reporting Scotland.

Prior to working for the BBC, she worked at the Scottish Football Museum and the Glasgow Herald newspaper. McGuire is also a qualified football referee.
She was once the 41st most eligible woman in Scotland by Scotland on Sunday magazine.

Notes 

Scottish journalists
Scottish women journalists
Living people
1977 births